The Anglican Diocese of Bauchi is one of ten within the Anglican Province of Jos, itself one of 14 provinces within the Church of Nigeria. The current bishop is Musa Mwin Tula.

Notes

Dioceses of the Province of Jos
 
Bauchi